Saint-Jean-de-Folleville is a commune in the Seine-Maritime department in the Normandy region in northern France.

Geography
The river Seine marks the southern border of the commune.

Population

Places of interest
 The church of St. Jean, dating from the thirteenth century.
 The church of Notre-Dame, in the village of Radicatel, dating from the sixteenth century.
 The eighteenth-century farmhouse de Gouberville, once owned by the father of Charlotte Corday.

See also
Communes of the Seine-Maritime department

References

Communes of Seine-Maritime